Alphonse Adrien Meignant (27 March 1882 – 4 November 1914) was a French rower. He competed in the men's coxed four, inriggers event at the 1912 Summer Olympics. He was killed in action during World War I.

See also
 List of Olympians killed in World War I

References

External links
 
 

1882 births
1914 deaths
French male rowers
Olympic rowers of France
Rowers at the 1912 Summer Olympics
Rowers from Paris
French military personnel killed in World War I